Gajner Wildlife Sanctuary is located at a distance of about  from Bikaner. In former times, it was a hunting ground for the Maharajah of Bikaner. There is a lake in this sanctuary and a variety of animals come here to quench their thirst in summer. This is one of the proposed forests for the reintroduction of cheetahs in India.

Flora and fauna

The lake in this wildlife sanctuary draws a variety of bird species. The residential species include wildfowl, deer, antelope, nilgai, chinkara, black buck, desert fox and wild boar. the temperature of this area is about 40 °C

References

External links

 

Wildlife sanctuaries in Rajasthan
Cheetah reintroduction in India
Protected areas with year of establishment missing
Bikaner district